Scott M. Rodell is a martial artist, author, and teacher of Yang-style taijiquan.  He is the founding director of Great River Taoist Center, a non-profit organization based in Washington, D.C.

Training & Lineage
Rodell began studying martial arts at the age of nine. He practiced karate, judo, tournament and instinct archery, wrestling, Olympic fencing, and marksmanship before devoting his training exclusively to Yang-style taijiquan in 1981.

Rodell studied taijiquan with two senior students of Cheng Man-ch'ing, William C.C. Chen and T.T. Liang, before finding his principal teacher, Wang Yen-nien.  From Wang, Rodell learned the entire Yangjia Michuan Taijiquan (“Yang Family Hidden Teaching”) system.  Wang Yen-nien is a disciple student of Zhang Qinlin, who in turn studied with Yang Chengfu and later Yang Jianhou.

In addition to his martial studies, Rodell was one of the first ten Americans to enter the door of the Jin Shan Pai, a traditional school of Taoist neigong.  Rodell, initiated into the Jin Shan Pai by Wang Yen-nien, is a sixth generation teacher in this tradition.

Teaching career
In 1984, Rodell founded and became director of Great River Taoist Center, a non-profit organization whose mission is to preserve and transmit the Yang family arts.

In 1991, Rodell began teaching in the Soviet Union at the request of the Soviet Wushu Federation.  In 1992, the Great River officially opened a Moscow branch.  Since then, Rodell's seminars and training camps have expanded Great River Taoist Center to include many branch groups and affiliates located throughout the continental United States, Northern Europe, and Australia.  Northern European locations include the Estonian cities of Tallinn, Tartu, and Narva; Amsterdam, Netherlands; Angers, France; and Malmö, Sweden.

Tournament Record
USAWKF Northeast Regional Competition, June 24 & 25, 1995, NYC
Men’s Advanced Light Weight Restricted Step Push Hands Champion
Men’s Middle Weight Moving Step Push Hands, Third Place
International Taiji Quan Championship, 1990, Republic of China
Men’s featherweight Push Hands, Second Place

Further reading
Rodell, Scott M. (2008) A Practical Guide to Test Cutting for Historical Swordsmanship.  Seven Stars Books and Video. 
Rodell, Scott M. (2003) Chinese Swordsmanship – The Yang Family Taiji Jian Tradition.  Seven Stars Books and Video. 
Rodell, Scott M. (1991) Taiji Notebook for Martial Artists.  Seven Stars Books and Video. 
Garsson, Steven. "Serious About Swords: Advanced Students of Sword Meet at Ashokan Sword to Discuss the Weapon's True Place in History." Tactical Knives, May 2006.
Rollins, Jonathan. "Steel Wrapped in Cotton: The Forgotten Martial Side of Tai Chi Chuan." Black Belt Magazine, November 2005.
Pol, Epi van de. "Interview with a Chinese Weapon Specialist." (trans.), Taiji-Vizier, August 2004.
Rodell, Scott M. "Yang Family Taijiquan: The Hidden Tradition."  Inside Kungfu, Mar. 1993.

References

External links
Great River Taoist Center (GRTC)
Yangjia Michuan Taijiquan International
Still Mountain Tai Chi Center
GRTC Australia
GRTC Estonia

American tai chi practitioners
Living people
Year of birth missing (living people)